SB  Marjorie is a 56-ton wooden Thames sailing barge, built by Orvis at Ipswich, Suffolk, England in 1898 for R. & W. Paul Ltd. She was used to carry various cargoes on the London River and along the Channel.

See also
 Thames Sailing Barge Match

References

External links
Damage caused by accident during 2008 Swale match  

Thames sailing barges
1898 ships
Individual sailing vessels
Transport on the River Thames
Sailing ships of the United Kingdom